Ioannina is one of the regional units of Greece. 

It is part of the region of Epirus. Its capital is the city of Ioannina. It is the largest regional unit in Epirus, and one of the largest regional units of Greece, with a population of 167,901 people, according to the 2011 census.

Geography
Ioannina borders Albania in the north, and the regional units of Kastoria in the northeast, Grevena and Trikala in the east, Arta in the southeast, Preveza in the south and Thesprotia in the southwest and west.

Ioannina is a mountainous region, dominated by the Pindus mountains, that cover the eastern part of the regional unit. The main subranges of the Pindus are from north to south: Gramos, Smolikas (2,637 m, the highest of the Pindus), Tymfi, Lygkos, Lakmos and Athamanika. The lower Xerovouni mountains are situated in the south, and the Tomaros in the southwest.

Lake Pamvotida is the largest lake of Epirus. Several major rivers have their source in the Ioannina regional unit, including Aoös, Arachthos and Acheron.

History
See also the history sections of the Epirus and Ioannina articles.

The area of the present regional unit of Ioannina joined Greece in 1913, after the First Balkan War.

Administration

The regional unit Ioannina is subdivided into 8 municipalities. These are (number as in the map in the infobox):
Dodoni (3)
Ioannina (1)
Konitsa (6)
Metsovo (7)
North Tzoumerka (Voreia Tzoumerka, 2)
Pogoni (8)
Zagori (5)
Zitsa (4)

Prefecture

Ioannina was established as a prefecture in 1915. As a part of the 2011 Kallikratis government reform, the regional unit Ioannina was created out of the former prefecture Ioannina. The prefecture had the same territory as the present regional unit. At the same time, the municipalities were reorganised, according to the table below.

Provinces
Province of Dodoni - Ioannina
Province of Konitsa - Konitsa
Province of Metsovo - Metsovo
Province of Pogoni - Delvinaki
Note: Provinces no longer hold any legal status in Greece.

Transport
Egnatia Odos (A2)/E90, NW, Cen., NE
Ionia Odos (A5)/E55, E951, S, Cen.
Greek National Road 5/E55 S, Cen.
Greek National Road 6, W, Cen., E
Greek National Road 17, S, SW
Greek National Road 20/E853, Cen., NW, N
Greek National Road 26, NW
Ioannina Airport

Tourism
The prefecture of Ioannina, like most of the Greek mainland, is not as popular as the islands among tourists. However, besides the city Ioannina, there are a number of attractions in the area, including:

 A few kilometres south of the city is the Vrellis wax statue museum, displaying scenes from Greek history. A small department in the city centre is free to the public.
 The Dodoni oracle and archaeological site with amphitheatre.
 The Vikos–Aoös National Park, including the Vikos gorge, through which the Voidomatis river flows.
 The Zagori villages, partly in the Vikos-Aoos National Park.
 Papingo, one of the Zagoria villages, a ski resort that is mainly popular with Greeks, and a popular starting point for hiking and mountaineering.
 Mount Smolikas, at 2,637 meters Greece's second highest mountain.
 Metsovo, in winter a ski resort.
 The caves of Perama, a few kilometres northeast of Ioannina.
 The monument in Zalongo for the women of Souli.
 The Kalpaki War Museum.
 Bourzani Bridge, near Melissoptera.
 Pavlos Vrellis Greek History Museum, the best known wax museum in Greece

Sports
Ioannina has a major football team, that is named PAS Giannina. There are minor sports teams throughout the prefecture:

Averoff
Dafnoula
Eleousa
Kefalovrysi
Metsovo
Mousiotitsa
Velissario

Literature 
 Franz X. Bogner & Georgios Pilidis. Lake of  Ioannina. 128 pages. . Ioannina 2010.

See also
List of settlements in the Ioannina regional unit

References

 
Prefectures of Greece
1915 establishments in Greece
Regional units in Epirus (region)